Katherine Cadwallader Douglass (born November 17, 2001) is an American swimmer who is currently on the USA National Team. In 2021 she placed second in the 200m meter individual medley at the 2020 Olympic Swimming Trials, qualifying for the US Olympic Team. At the 2020 Summer Olympics, she won a bronze medal in the same event. She is currently swimming for the University of Virginia where she competes at the collegiate level, and is an eight-time NCAA champion (five individual, three relay). In addition, she also holds the American record in the women's 50 yard freestyle, 100 yard butterfly, and 200 yard breaststroke. At the 2022 NCAA Division I Women's Swimming and Diving Championships, Douglass became the first swimmer to win three individual titles in three different strokes.

Early life
Douglass was born on November 17, 2001 in Pelham, New York as the daughter of Allison and William Douglass. She has a younger sister, Abby, and a younger brother, Will. She attended Pelham Memorial High School and graduated in 2019. Douglass first swam for the Westchester Aquatic Club in New York, before moving to the Chelsea Piers Aquatic Club in Connecticut in 2017.

Career

2016
Douglass first came onto the swimming spotlight as a high school sophomore in November 2016, when she broke Olympian Dara Torres's 34-year old 13-14 National Age Group record of 22.44 in the 50 yard freestyle, swimming a time of 22.32 at a high school state meet. A month later, at the 2016 U.S. Winter Junior Championships, Douglass tied Simone Manuel's 15-16 National Age group record in the 50 yard freestyle with a time of 22.04.

2016 US Olympic Trials
Douglass qualified for trials and swam the 50 meter free, 100 meter breaststroke, 200 meter breaststroke, and 200 meter individual medley at the 2016 United States Olympic trials, placing 32nd, 48th, 77th, and 81st in each event respectively and not making the Olympic team.

2017

2017 FINA World Junior Championships

At the 2017 FINA World Junior Swimming Championships as a member of the USA Junior National Team, Douglass finished eleventh in the semifinals of the 50 meter freestyle, and did not qualify for finals. She also swam in the preliminary heats of the 4x100 meter freestyle relay, which ended up getting a silver medal.

2018
In her junior year of high school, Douglass verbally committed to swim for the University of Virginia's class of 2023. Due to her National Age Group Records in the 50 yard freestyle and her top-ranked times in the breaststroke and individual medley events, she was named SwimSwam's #2 girls' recruit in their Class of 2019 rankings.

At the 2018 Summer Youth Olympics, Douglass placed seventh overall in the finals of the 50 meter freestyle.

2020
Although Douglass had a national age-group record heading into college, she broke through as an elite swimmer in her freshman year at Virginia. At a dual meet in October 2019, Douglass swam a 22.28 second 50-yard freestyle and a 2:07.92 200 yard breaststroke, becoming only the third female swimmer to swim 22-point the 50 free and 2:07 in the 200 breast, which highlighted her versatility as those two events are very different from each other. She then improved her best time in the 200 breaststroke to 2:06.19 in January 2020. In November 2019, Douglass broke the ACC conference record in the 200 yard individual medley with a time of 1:52.84.

At the 2020 ACC Championships, Douglass won the 200-yard individual medley title in a time of 1:51.36, making her the fastest freshman ever in the event and the fourth-fastest in history. Her swim also re-broke her conference record from prior. She also won a conference title in the 100-yard butterfly with a time of 50.83 and placed third in the 200-yard breaststroke with a personal best time of 2:05.89 to help Virginia win their 16th ACC championship. Headed into the 2020 NCAA Championships, Douglass was the top seed in the 200-yard individual medley, the third seed in the 200-yard breaststroke, and the fourth seed in the 100-yard butterfly, but the meet was cancelled due to the COVID-19 pandemic.

2021

NCAA Season
At the Tennessee Invitational in November 2020, Douglass swam a 200-yard individual medley in a time of 1:50.82 to become the third-fastest performer of all time in the event. Her time was just three-tenths off of Ella Eastin's NCAA record of 1:50.62. She also split a 21.96 while swimming the 50 yard butterfly on Virginia's 200 medley relay, which stands today as the fastest 50 butterfly time in history. In addition, Douglass swam a 47.77 100 yard freestyle and a 50.18 100 yard butterfly, both best times for her.

During a time trial swim in February 2021, Douglass swam a 2:03.92 200-yard breaststroke, moving her up the rankings as the ninth-fastest performer of all time in the event.

Douglass started off 2021 ACC Championships by breaking the NCAA record in the 200 medley relay with her teammates Caroline Gemlich, Alexis Wenger, and Lexi Cuomo. She swam the freestyle leg of the relay. The next day, she was upset by her teammate, freshman Alex Walsh, in the 200 yard individual medley. Despite being the favorite in the event coming into the race, Douglass swam a second slower than her best time with a time of 1:51.97 to come in second, while Walsh had an improvement of over two seconds with her best time to win with a time of 1:51.53. However, Douglass took home two ACC titles in 2021, winning the 100 yard freestyle with a time of 46.83 and the 100 yard butterfly with a time of 49.96.

Coming into the 2021 NCAA Championships, Douglass was the top ranked swimming in the 50 yard freestyle, 100 yard freestyle, 200 yard individual medley, and 200 yard breaststroke. However, she opted for the sprint races, choosing to swim the 50 yard freestyle, 100 yard freestyle, and 100 yard butterfly at the meet. Douglass won her first NCAA title when she beat Michigan's Maggie MacNeil by four-hundredths of a second in the 50-yard freestyle with a time of 21.13. However, her best time of 21.09 came from leading off of Virginia's second-place finishing 200 yard freestyle relay. She then finished second to MacNeil in both the 100 yard freestyle and 100 yard butterfly, swimming times of 46.30 and 49.55 respectively, and was a part of four Virginia second-place relays: the 200 yard medley relay, the 200 yard freestyle relay, the 400 yard freestyle relay, and the 400 yard medley relay.

2020 U.S. Olympic Trials
At the 2020 United States Olympic trials that were held in June 2021, Douglass swam in four events: the 50 meter freestyle, 100 meter freestyle, 100 meter butterfly, and the 200 meter individual medley. She started off trials by missing out on the Olympic team when she finished third in the 100 meter butterfly, swimming a time of 56.56 that was just 0.13 seconds behind second-place finisher Claire Curzan's 56.43. However, in the 200 meter individual medley, Douglass finished second to Alex Walsh and swam a personal best time of 2:09.32. Her second-place finish allowed her to qualify for her first-ever Olympic games. However, the race was incredibly close, as only 0.02 seconds separated her and third-place finisher Madisyn Cox.

In addition, Douglass also finished seventh in the 50 meter freestyle and 100 meter freestyle, swimming times of 24.78 and 54.17 respectively.

2020 Olympic Games

At the 2020 Olympic Games, Douglass swam the top time in both the preliminary and semi-final rounds of the 200 meter individual medley. However, in the finals, she finished third. Douglass beat fourth-place finisher Abbie Wood by 0.06 seconds, being behind before the 50 meters of the race and running her down in the freestyle leg to grab the bronze medal in a personal best time of 2:09.04. Japan's Yui Ohashi won gold, and Douglass's teammate Alex Walsh won the silver.

2021 FINA Short Course World Swimming Championships

At the Short Course World Championships in Abu Dhabi, which were also postponed from 2020 to 2021, she won two gold medals in the 4x50 metres and 4x100 metres women's relays as well as a bronze medal in the 200 metres individual medley, as at the Olympic Games.

In addition, she got awarded two silver medals for having competed in the preliminary heats for the women's 4x50 metres medley and the mixed 4x50 metres medley.

2022

NCAA Season
At the 2021 Tennessee Invite, Douglass broke Sophie Hansson's ACC record in the 200-yard breaststroke, swimming a time of 2:03.58 to become the fourth-fastest performer of all time. She then bettered that time to 2:03.14 at the 2022 Cavalier Invite in February to become the second-fastest performer of all-time in the event.

Douglass then opted to swim only sprint events at the 2022 ACC Championships, and she won titles in the 50-yard freestyle, 100-yard freestyle, and 100-yard butterfly. Her time of 21.00 in the 50 free was the second-fastest performance of all time, trailing Abbey Weitzeil's then-NCAA record time of 20.90 by just 0.1 seconds. In addition, she was also a part of Virginia's 200 freestyle, 200 medley, and 400 medley relays that broke NCAA, U.S. Open, and American records. She scored 96 individual points to help Virginia win their third-straight ACC team championship.

2022 NCAA Championships

 

At the 2022 NCAA Championships in Atlanta, Douglass won seven titles, including three single and four relay titles. She began the meet by breaking the NCAA, U.S. Open, and American record in the preliminary rounds of the 50 free, swimming a 20.87. Then, in the finals, she lowered that record time to a 20.84, successfully defending her national title in the event. The next day, she upset defending Olympic and NCAA champion Maggie MacNeil as well as long course American record holder Torri Huske to win the 100 fly, swimming a time of 49.04 to break Claire Curzan's American record of 49.24 (MacNeil, a Canadian, holds the fastest time in history at 48.89). On the final day of the meet, Douglass won the 200 breaststroke by over two seconds, clocking a 2:02.19 to break Lilly King's NCAA, U.S. Open, and American record. By virtue of her wins, she became the first D1 collegiate swimmer, male or female, to win three NCAA titles in three different strokes.

In addition to her individual efforts, Douglass was also a part of Virginia's national championship winning 200 free, 200 medley, 400 free, and 400 medley relays, with the latter two relays having broken NCAA, U.S. Open, and American records. In the end, Virginia won their second-consecutive NCAA team title by over 100 points.

Douglass's performances prompted the CSCAA and swimming news outlet SwimSwam to name her as the 2022 NCAA Female Swimmer of the Year. In addition, swimming commentator Rowdy Gaines described her swims as "the greatest single-meet performance in NCAA history".

In May 2022, Douglass was given the 2022 Honda Sport Award for Swimming and Diving, an award to honor the top female athlete in each Division I NCAA sport.

2022 USA Swimming International Team Trials

At the 2022 U.S. World Championship Trials in Greensboro, North Carolina Douglass qualified for the 200 metres breaststroke at the World Championshíps in Budapest. She came into the meet with a best time of 2:28.00, but brought her time down to a 2:21.43 to finish second and nearly out-touch defending Olympic silver medalist Lilly King in her race.

In addition, Douglass also finished fifth in the 100-meter freestyle, which qualified her for a spot on the women's 4x100 freestyle relay at Worlds.

2022 World Championships

In Budapest, she won the bronze medal over the 200 metres breaststroke as well as the bronze medal in the women's 4x100 metres freestyle relay. For the 4x100 metres freestyle mixed relay, she was also awarded with a bronze medal as she competed in the heats and helped her country to qualify for the final.

2022 FINA Short Course World Swimming Championships

At the Short Course World Championships in Melbourne, she won a gold medal in the 200 metres individual medley, setting a new Americas record in 2:02.12 and swimmming the second fastest time ever over this distance after Katinka Hosszú in Doha, Qatar on 06 December 2014 in 2:01.86. This was her first individual title in a global competition.

Further, she won a silver medal with the Women's 4 × 100 metre freestyle relay in 3:26.29, setting another Americas record and a gold medal with the 4 x 50 metre mixed medley relay setting a new world record. She also won a gold medal with the Women's 4 x 50 metre freestyle relay with another Americas and championship record. She won a gold medal in the 4 x 100 metre medley relay by setting a new world record and another silver medal in the Women's 4 × 50 metre medley relay.

She also won the gold medal in the 200 metre breaststroke by setting a new championship record, winning her second individual title in a global competition within three days.

2023

NCAA Season
At the 2022 Tennessee Invite, Douglass broke her own NCAA, U.S. Open, and American record in the 200-yard breaststroke, swimming a time of 2:01.87.  At the 2023 Cavalier Invitational, Douglass then further reset the U.S. Open and American record in the 200-yard breaststroke with a time of 2:01.43, becoming the fastest ever in the event by over a second. However, as this swim was done as a time trial, it was not eligible as an NCAA record. 

At the 2023 ACC Championships, Douglass swam the 100-yard butterfly, 200-yard individual medley, and the 100-yard freestyle, winning the title in all 3 events. She recorded a time of 48.84 in the 100-yard butterfly, setting NCAA, U.S. Open, and American records, as well as swimming a time of 45.86 in the 100-yard freestyle which made her the third woman under 46 seconds in the event  and a time of 1:50.15 in the 200-yard IM, placing her at second fastest of all time and just 0.07 seconds off Alex Walsh's record, her teammate at Virginia.

World records

Short course metres

 split 24.09 (butterfly leg); with Ryan Murphy (backstroke leg), Nic Fink (breaststroke leg), Torri Huske (freestyle leg)
 split 50.47 (freestyle leg); with Claire Curzan (backstroke leg), Lilly King (breaststroke leg), Torri Huske (butterfly leg)

Awards and honors
Honda Sports Award for Swimming & Diving - 2022
Atlantic Coast Conference (ACC) Women's Swimmer of the Year - 2022
College Swimming and Diving Coaches Association of America (CSCAA) Division I Women's Swimmer of the Year - 2022

References

2001 births
Living people
American female freestyle swimmers
Virginia Cavaliers women's swimmers
Swimmers at the 2018 Summer Youth Olympics
Swimmers at the 2020 Summer Olympics
Medalists at the 2020 Summer Olympics
Olympic bronze medalists for the United States in swimming
Medalists at the FINA World Swimming Championships (25 m)
World Aquatics Championships medalists in swimming
21st-century American women